Ted Lewis (15 January 1940 – 27 March 1982) was a British writer known for his crime fiction.

Early life
Alfred Edward Lewis was born in Stretford, Manchester and was an only child. After the Second World War the family moved to Barton-upon-Humber in Lincolnshire. He had a strict upbringing and his parents did not want their son to go to art school, but his English teacher Henry Treece, recognising his creative talents in writing and art, persuaded them not to stand in his way. Lewis attended Hull Art School for four years.

Career
Lewis's first work was in London, in advertising, and then as an animation specialist in television and films (among them the Beatles' Yellow Submarine). His first novel, All the Way Home and All the Night Through, was published in 1965, followed by Jack's Return Home, which created the noir school of British crime writing and pushed Lewis into the best-seller list. The novel was later retitled Get Carter after the success of the film of the same name, based on the novel and starring Michael Caine. After the collapse of his marriage Lewis returned to his home town.

Lewis wrote several episodes for the television series Z-Cars. Producer Graham Williams of Doctor Who , who had worked with Lewis on Z-Cars, commissioned a script entitled The Doppelgangers in 1978 from Lewis. However, the script was rejected early the next year, and was never put into production.

Lewis's final book, assessed as his best by some critics, was GBH, published in 1980, the title referring to grievous bodily harm in British law. Lewis died in 1982 aged 42 of alcohol-related causes.

In October 2017 Nick Triplow published a detailed biography Getting Carter: Ted Lewis and the Birth of Brit Noir.

In 2020 The Ted Lewis Centre opened in Barton upon Humber celebrating his life and works.

Books
 All the Way Home and All the Night Through (1965)
 Jack's Return Home (1970) (paperback published in 1971 as Carter. Later re-published as Get Carter)
 Plender (1971)
 Billy Rags (1973)
 Jack Carter's Law (1974)
 The Rabbit (1975)
 Boldt (1976)
 Jack Carter and the Mafia Pigeon (1977)
 GBH (1980)

Films
 Jack's Return Home has been filmed three times:
 Get Carter (1971) with Michael Caine
 Hit Man (1972) with Bernie Casey and Pam Grier
 Get Carter (2000) with Sylvester Stallone
 Plender has been adapted as a French film:
 Le Serpent (2007) directed by Eric Barbier

References

Further reading
 Nick Triplow: Getting Carter : Ted Lewis and the birth of Brit Noir, Harpenden, UK : No Exit Press, 2017,

External links
 
 TW Books
 The Best Thriller
 

1940 births
1982 deaths
Writers from Manchester
People from Stretford
People from Barton-upon-Humber
English crime fiction writers
English television writers
20th-century English novelists
20th-century English screenwriters